Fiction House was an American publisher of pulp magazines and comic books that existed from the 1920s to the 1950s. It was founded by John B. "Jack" Kelly and John W. Glenister. By the late 1930s, the publisher was Thurman T. Scott. Its comics division was best known for its pinup-style good girl art, as epitomized by the company's most popular character, Sheena, Queen of the Jungle.

Leadership and location 
The company's original location was 461 Eighth Avenue in New York City. At the end of 1929, a New York Times article referred to John B. Kelly as "head" of Fiction House, Inc., and a new location of 271 Madison Avenue.

In late 1932, John W. Glenister was president of Fiction House and his son-in-law, Thurman T. Scott, was secretary of the corporation. By the end of the 1930s Scott had risen to the title of publisher.

In January 1950, the Manhattan-based company signed a lease for office space at 130 W. 42nd Street.

History

Pulp fiction
Fiction House began in 1921 as a pulp-magazine publisher of primarily aviation, Western, and sports pulps. According to co-founder John W. Glenister:

During their first decade the company produced pulp magazines such as Action Stories, Air Stories, Lariat Stories, Detective Classics, The Frontier, True Adventures, Wings, and Fight Stories. Fiction House occasionally acquired other publishers' magazines, such as its 1929 acquisition of Frontier Stories from Doubleday, Doran & Co.

By the 1930s, the company had expanded into detective mysteries. In late 1932, however, in the midst of the Great Depression, Fiction House cancelled 12 of its pulp magazines — Aces, Action Novels, Action Stories, Air Stories, Detective Book Magazine, Detective Classics, Fight Stories, Frontier Stories, Lariat, Love Romances, North-West Stories and Wings — with the stated goal of eventually reviving them.

After a hiatus, Action Stories resumed publishing through this period (lasting until late 1950). In addition, Fiction House relaunched its pulp magazines in 1934, finding success with a number of detective and romance pulp titles. The cancelled pulps Fight Stories and Detective Book Magazine were revived in spring 1936 and in 1937 respectively, with both magazines publishing continuously into the 1950s. Fiction House's first title with science fiction interest was Jungle Stories, which was launched in early 1939; it was not primarily a science fiction magazine, but often featured storylines with marginally science fictional themes, such as survivors from Atlantis. At the end of 1939 Fiction House decided to add an sf magazine to its line up; it was titled Planet Stories, and was published by Love Romances, a subsidiary company that Fiction House created to publish the company's romance titles.

Comic books

By the late 1930s, publisher Thurman T. Scott expanded Fiction House into comic books, an emerging medium that began to seem a viable adjunct to the fading pulps. Receptive to a sales call by Eisner & Iger, one of the prominent "packagers" of that time which produced complete comic books on demand for publishers looking to enter the field, Scott published Jumbo Comics #1 (Sept. 1938) under the company's Real Adventures Publishing Company imprint.

Sheena, Queen of the Jungle appeared in that initial issue, soon becoming the company's star character. Sheena appeared in every issue of Jumbo Comics (Sept. 1938 – April 1953), as well as in her 18-issue spin-off, Sheena, Queen of the Jungle (Spring 1942 – Winter 1952), the first comic book to title-star a female character. Other features in Jumbo Comics #1 included three by future industry legend Jack Kirby, representing his first comic-book work following his debut in Wild Boy Magazine: the science fiction feature The Diary of Dr. Hayward (under the pseudonym "Curt Davis"), the modern-West crimefighter strip Wilton of the West (as "Fred Sande"), and Part One of the  swashbuckling serialization of Alexandre Dumas, père's The Count of Monte Cristo (as "Jack Curtiss"),  each four pages long.

Jumbo proved a hit, and Fiction House would go on to publish Jungle Comics; the aviation-themed Wings Comics; the science fiction title Planet Comics; Rangers Comics; and Fight Comics during the early 1940s — most of these series taking their titles and themes from the Fiction House pulps. Fiction House referred to these titles in its regular house ads as "The Big Six," but the company also published several other titles, among them the Western-themed Indians and Firehair, jungle titles Sheena, Queen of the Jungle and Wambi, and five issues of Eisner's The Spirit.

Quickly developing its own staff under editor Joe Cunningham followed by Jack Burden, Fiction House employed either in-house or on a freelance basis such artists as Mort Meskin, Matt Baker (the first prominent African-American artist in comics), Nick Cardy, George Evans, Bob Powell, and the British Lee Elias, as well as such rare female comics artists as Ruth Atkinson, Fran Hopper, Lily Renée, and Marcia Snyder.

The popularity of Sheena led to numerous other Fiction House "jungle girls":
 Ann Mason (Jungle Comics) — the mate of Ka'a'nga, Jungle King; like Sheena, wears a leopard skin dress
 Jessie (Jungle Comics) — replaces Ann as the mate of Ka'a'nga
 Camilla, Wild Girl of the Congo (Jungle Comics) — wears a zebra skin dress
 Fantomah, Mystery Woman of the Jungle  (Jungle Comics) — one comics' earliest super-powered heroines, created by Fletcher Hanks
 Princess Taj (Jungle Comics) — rides an elephant
 Tiger Girl (Fight Comics)
 Princess Vishnu (Fight Comics)

Feminist comics historian Trina Robbins, writes that:

Despite such pre-feminist pedigree, Fiction House found itself targeted in psychiatrist Dr. Fredric Wertham's book Seduction of the Innocent (1954), which in part blamed comic books for an increase in juvenile delinquency. Aside from the ostensible effects of gory horror in comic books, Wertham cast blame on the sexy, pneumatic heroines of Fiction House, Fox Comics and other companies. A subsequent, wide-ranging investigation by the Senate Subcommittee on Juvenile Delinquency, coupled with outcry by parents, a downturn in comics sales, the demise of the pulps, and the rise of television and paperback novels competing for readers and leisure time, Fiction House faced an increasingly difficult business environment, and soon closed shop.

List of Fiction House pulps

List of Fiction House comic books

"The Big Six" 

 Fight Comics (86 issues, Jan. 1940–[Jan.] 1954)
 Jumbo Comics (167 issues, Sept. 1938–Mar. 1953)
 Jungle Comics (163 issues, Jan. 1940–Summer 1954)
 Planet Comics (73 issues, Jan. 1940–Winter 1953)
  Rangers of Freedom Comics / Rangers Comics (69 issues, October 1941–Winter 1953)
 Wings Comics (124 issues, Sept. 1940–1954)

Other titles (selected) 
 3-D Circus (1 issue, 1953)
 Cowgirl Romances (12 issues, 1950–Winter 1952/1953)
 The First Christmas (1 issue, 1953; 3-D)
 Ghost Comics (11 issues, 1951–1954)
 Indians (17 issues, 1950–1953)
 Ka'a'nga, Jungle King (20 issues, Spring 1949–Summer 1954)
 Long Bow (9 issues, 1951–Winter 1952/1953)
 Man O' Mars (1 issue, 1953)
 Movie Comics (4 issues, Dec. 1946–1947)
 Pioneer West Romances / Firehair (11 issues, Spring 1950–Spring 1952)
 Sheena, Queen of the Jungle (18 issues, Spring 1942–Winter 1952/1953)
 The Spirit (5 issues, 1952–54)
 Wambi, Jungle Boy (18 issues, Spring 1942–Winter 1952)

References

Further reading
 Comic Book Marketplace vol. 2, #57 (March 1998): "Fiction House Pulps!" by Christian K. Berger, pp. 34–37, 44
 Comic Book Marketplace vol. 2 2, #60 (June 1998): "Fiction House Sci-Fi" (cover gallery) pp. 40–43
 Comic Book Marketplace vol. 2, #72 Oct. 1999): Letter from Bill Black on Australian versions of Fiction House comics, pp. 8–9
 Fiction House: A Golden Age Index compiled by Henry Steele (San Francisco, A. Dellinges, 1978)
 Fiction House: A Golden Age Index of Planet Comics (San Francisco: A. Dellinges, 1978)
 Ron Goulart's Comics History Magazine #4 (Summer 1997): "The History of Good Girl Art", Part 2, pp. 3–5

 Fiction House: From Pulps To Panels, From Jungles To Space by Mitch Maglio, Yoe Books (2017)

External links

 
 
 Good Girl Art at AC Comics.com
 Galactic Central

Comic book publishing companies of the United States
Defunct comics and manga publishing companies
Pulp magazine publishing companies of the United States
Publishing companies established in 1921
Magazine publishing companies of the United States
1921 establishments in New York City